Cherry Valley may refer to:

Places in the United States:
 Cherry Valley, Arkansas
 Cherry Valley, California, in Riverside County
 Cherry Valley, Illinois
 Cherry Valley, Missouri
 Cherry Valley, New York, site of:
 The Cherry Valley massacre, an event during the American Revolutionary War
 Cherry Valley (village), New York
 Cherry Valley Creek (New York)
Cherry Valley (valley), New York, valley running along Cherry Valley Creek 
 Cherry Valley, Pennsylvania
 Cherry Valley, Tennessee
 Cherry Valley Township, Winnebago County, Illinois
 Cherry Valley Township, Michigan
 Cherry Valley Township, Ashtabula County, Ohio
 Camp Cherry Valley in California, on Catalina Island

Places in Canada:
 Cherry Valley, Prince Edward County, Ontario

See also
 Cherryvalley
 Cherry Valley O-scale Model Railroad Club, in Merchantville, New Jersey